The 1934–35 Serie A season was the ninth season of the Serie A, the top level of ice hockey in Italy. Three teams participated in the league, and HC Diavoli Rossoneri Milano won the championship.

Regular season

Group A

External links
 Season on hockeytime.net

1934–35 in Italian ice hockey
Serie A (ice hockey) seasons
Italy